Bill Porter may refer to:
 Bill Porter (sound engineer) (1931–2010), American sound engineer and famous music pioneer
 Bill Porter (salesman) (1932–2013), American salesman with cerebral palsy
 Bill Porter (author) (born 1943), American author who writes under the name Red Pine
 Bill Porter (golfer) (born 1959), American golfer
 Bill Porter (play), a 1925 play by Upton Sinclair

See also
Billy Porter (disambiguation)
William Porter (disambiguation)